Children of Time is a 2015 science fiction novel by author Adrian Tchaikovsky.

The work was praised by the Financial Times for "tackling big themes—gods, messiahs, artificial intelligence, alienness—with brio."

It was selected from a shortlist of six works and a total pool of 113 books to be awarded the Arthur C. Clarke Award for best science fiction of the year in August 2016. The director of the award program said that the novel has a "universal scale and sense of wonder reminiscent of Clarke himself."

In July 2017, the rights were optioned for a potential film adaptation.

The next in the series, Children of Ruin, was published in 2019, followed by Children of Memory, in 2022.

Plot
In a far-future, Dr. Avrana Kern is the head of a science team that has terraformed an uninhabitable planet then deliberately released a genetically designed virus to speed the evolution of monkeys. Their plan goes wrong when the monkeys' ship burns up upon entry, leaving the virus to infect a variety of creatures, eventually settling on spiders (Portia labiata). Meanwhile, the last human remnants of a dying Earth are en route to the promised paradise planet unaware of the uplifted spiders. The work plays off the contrast between the rapid advancement of the spiders and the barbaric descent of the starship crew of the last humans.

Characters

Old Empire

Dr. Avrana Kern 
A self-described genius determined to "beget new sentient life" in humanity's own image. She escapes the destruction of her ship and spends millennia in suspended animation inside an observation satellite, hovering above the only world she managed to seed with the gene-editing nano-virus as it works its wonders on the population below.

Gilgamesh Key Crew

Commander Guyen 
Leader of the Gilgamesh who exercises often autocratic authority over the expedition and its human cargo. After Kern forces his hand, Guyen leads the ship to another terraformed world and discovers experimental old empire tech capable of uploading a human mind to a sufficiently sized computer. He eventually becomes dedicated to a new mission, uploading himself to the Gilgamesh computer, as a means of establishing firmer control over the ship itself before returning to Kern's world.

Holsten  
Chief classicist of the Gilgamesh, he is charged with the interpretation of the old empire language “Imperial C”. Holsten's primary responsibility is to help the ark ship navigate the territories and tech of the old empire, though he eventually embraces a higher mission, the establishment of a new cultural heritage for humanity based upon the historical narrative through which he lived while aboard the Gil.

Lain 
Chief engineer of the Gilgamesh and its eventual de facto leader, Lain is often forced to hold the ship together in the face of near-insurmountable technological breakdown. She becomes the spiritual leader of the Gil's generations of inhabitants after spending decades of her life guiding and protecting “the tribe” as well as the vessel itself. If Guyen is the villain in Holsten's historical narrative, then Lain is most certainly the heroine.

Vitas 
Chief science officer of the Gilgamesh and a stern adherent to professional objectivity, Vitas is more than capable of performing notable research. However, her ambitious scientific curiosity can often guide her down the wrong path. She is described as somewhat robotic and uncannily ageless by Holsten.

Karst 
The Gil's chief of security, though flamboyantly blunt, eventually proves himself a somewhat cautious leader by limiting weapons access during the ship's periods of internal confrontation. Originally intimidated by the gruff gunslinger, Holsten grows to respect Karst by the end of the novel.

Spiders 
The story takes place over many thousands of years and many generations of spider. The spiders have their own names, but the text refers to the major spiders by only four names based on their personality.

Portia 
Female Spider, warrior, priestess, leader

Bianca 
Female Spider, warrior, Scientist, leader, genius

Fabian 
Male Spider, Scientist, Rebel, genius, leader

Viola 
Female Spider, Scientist, genius

References

External links
 

2015 British novels
2015 science fiction novels
Novels set on fictional planets
Works about women in war
Tor Books books